Nectandra embirensis is a species of plant in the family Lauraceae. It is found in Brazil, Ecuador, and Peru. It is threatened by habitat loss.

References

embirensis
Trees of Brazil
Trees of Ecuador
Trees of Peru
Data deficient plants
Taxonomy articles created by Polbot